is a railway station located in the city of Iwaki, Fukushima Prefecture, Japan, operated by the East Japan Railway Company (JR East).

Lines

Station layout
The station has two opposed side platforms connected by a footbridge. The station is staffed.

Platforms

History
Nakoso Station was opened on 25 February 1897. The station was absorbed into the JR East network upon the privatization of the Japanese National Railways (JNR) on 1 April 1987.

Passenger statistics
In fiscal 2018, the station was used by an average of 833 passengers daily (boarding passengers only).

Surrounding area
Nakoso Post Office

See also
 List of railway stations in Japan

References

External links

   

Stations of East Japan Railway Company
Jōban Line
Railway stations in Japan opened in 1897
Iwaki, Fukushima